At the 2017 National Games of China, the athletics events were held at the Tianjin Olympic Center Stadium in Tianjin, People's Republic of China from 2–7 September 2017. The  marathon events were held in April, prior to the main track and field competitions. The marathon events were held on 29 April and started in a square in the Wuqing District of Tianjin and included a women's team marathon competition as well as amateur races. A total of 46 events were contested – 22 men's events, 23 women's events and one mixed-sex medley relay event over 1600 m.

The winner of the women's marathon Wang Jiali was later subject to a doping failure and both her and her coach were banned for life as a result (her second such infraction).

Medal summary

Men

Women

References

Wu, Vincent (2017-09-03). Yang proves consistency with victory at National Games. IAAF. Retrieved 2018-03-16.
Wu, Vincent (2017-09-05). Xie completes National Games sprint double with Chinese 200m record. IAAF. Retrieved 2018-03-16.
Wu, Vincent (2017-09-07). Gong ends triumphant season with third Chinese National Games title. IAAF. Retrieved  2018-03-16.
Asian Athletics 2017 Rankings. Asian Athletics Association. Retrieved 2018-03-16.

2017 National Games of China
2017
Chinese Games